1,2,4,5-Tetrachloro-3-nitrobenzene (tecnazene) is an organic compound with the formula .  It is a colorless solid. A related isomer is 1,2,3,4-tetrachloro-5-nitrobenzene.

It is used as a standard for quantitative analysis by nuclear magnetic resonance. 

1,2,4,5-Tetrachloro-3-nitrobenzene is also a fungicide used to prevent dry rot and sprouting on potatoes during storage.

References 

Fungicides
Analytical standards
Nitrobenzenes
Chlorobenzenes